Park Bench Theories is an album by Jamie Scott and the Town, released in 2007.

Production
Scott was backed by the band Travis, minus frontman Fran Healy.

Critical reception
AllMusic wrote that "the album's most powerful weapon is Scott himself, whose wondrous jazz-soul tones, part John Mayer, part Jeff Buckley, part Stevie Wonder, are able to elevate the occasionally bland and samey production into an engaging listen." The Guardian called the album "something of a supper-club Blood On The Tracks, being a series of diary entries about Scott's ugly bust-up with his ex-missus." The Irish Independent wrote that "superb echoey piano keys, accompanied by haunting string arrangements, make 'Shadows' the album's standout track."

Track listing 
 Runaway Train
 When Will I See Your Face Again
 London Town
 Changes
 Shadows
 Standing In The Rain
 Love Song To Remember
 Weeping Willow
 Two Men
 Rise Up
 Hey You
 Lady West
 Untitled

References

Jamie Scott and the Town albums